Redcar Athletic Football Club is a football club based in Redcar, North Yorkshire.

History
The club was established in 1993 as Teesside Athletic and initially played in the Teesside League. In 2005 they joined the Wearside League, and in 2010 the club's name was changed to Redcar Athletic.

Redcar have finished as Wearside League runners-up on three occasions before finally clinching their first championship in 2018, enabling them to win promotion to Division Two of the Northern League. In 2021 the club were promoted to Division One based on their results in the abandoned 2019–20 and 2020–21 seasons.

Ground 
The club currently play at Green Lane in Redcar.

Honours 

 Monkwearmouth Cup
 Winners 2005–06, 2016–17
 Shipowners Cup
 Winners 2008–09
 League Cup
 Winners 2006–07
 Total Sport Alan Hood Memorial Cup
 Winners 2016-17

Records 
Best Fa Vase performance: First Round, 2020-2021

References

External links
Club website

Football clubs in England
Football clubs in North Yorkshire
Association football clubs established in 1993
1993 establishments in England
Teesside Football League
Wearside Football League
Northern Football League
Redcar